Simon McTavish may refer to

 Simon McTavish (kayaker) (born 1996), Canadian sprint kayaker
 Simon McTavish (fur trader) (1750–1804), founding partner of the North West Company